The Division of Parkes was an Australian Electoral Division in the state of New South Wales. It was located in the south-west of Sydney, and originally included the suburbs of Canterbury, Burwood and Ashfield. By the time it was abolished in 1969, it had been redistributed to cover suburbs such as Earlwood and Harcourt.

The Division was proclaimed in 1900, and was one of the original 75 divisions to be contested at the first Federal election. It was named after Sir Henry Parkes, seventh Premier of New South Wales and sometimes known as the 'Father of Federation'. The seat was vacant for a short time at the end of 1930, when Edward McTiernan was appointed a Justice of the High Court of Australia. He was to become the longest serving Justice of that court.

At the redistribution of 11 October 1984, a new Division of Parkes was created. However, this was located in north-west rural New South Wales, and had no connection to this Division.

Members

Election results

1901 establishments in Australia
Constituencies established in 1901
1969 disestablishments in Australia
Constituencies disestablished in 1969
Former electoral divisions of Australia